Tony Harvey is an American basketball coach who last served as an assistant coach for the Eastern Michigan Eagles men's basketball team. He served as the head coach of the Texas Southern Tigers from 2008 to 2012.

Early life
Born in South Bend, Indiana, Harvey was raised in Benton Harbor, Michigan, and graduated from Benton Harbor High School in 1983. He attended Louisiana Tech University for one year before he earned an associate degree from the North Dakota State College of Science, where he also played on the basketball team. Harvey completed the final two years of his college career at Cameron University, where he was an all-conference player and graduated in 1988.

Coaching career
Harvey began his coaching career as an assistant coach at his alma mater Benton Harbor High School from 1989 to 1992. He served as an assistant coach for the Southern Jaguars from 1992 to 1994, and the McNeese State Cowboys from 1994 to 1996. Harvey had a short stint as the associate head coach at Compton College in 1996 before he was appointed as an assistant coach for the Eastern Michigan Eagles from 1996 to 1999. He was influential in the development of future National Basketball Association (NBA) players Earl Boykins and Derrick Dial while in that role. On April 14, 1999, Harvey joined the Missouri Tigers as the first assistant coach to join Quin Snyder's staff. He established a system that helped the Missouri Tigers produce some of the top ranked recruitment classes nationally. He left the Missouri Tigers in 2004 amidst allegations of NCAA rules violations that he was later cleared of by an NCAA committee. After his departure from Missouri, Harvey worked as a basketball director for MAC Sports and Entertainment and operated clinics.

On April 13, 2008, Harvey was appointed head coach of the Texas Southern Tigers. He led the team to a 7–25 record during his first season but improved to 17–16 and a second-place finish in the Southwestern Athletic Conference (SWAC) tournament the following season. The Texas Southern Tigers achieved a 19–13 record during the 2010–11 season, won the SWAC tournament, and earned a bid to the 2011 National Invitation Tournament as their first postseason appearance since 2003; Harvey was named as the SWAC Coach of the Year. The Tigers went 15–18 and lost to the Mississippi Valley State Delta Devils in the SWAC title game. On July 2, 2012, Harvey resigned as head coach of the Texas Southern Tigers. He achieved a 58–72 record during his tenure.

On September 5, 2017, Harvey joined the UIC Flames men's basketball team as an assistant coach. On September 1, 2020, Harvey returned to the Eastern Michigan Eagles as an assistant coach.

Personal life
Harvey is the son of Lou Harvey, who served as a coach of the girls' basketball team at Benton Harbor High School.

References

American men's basketball coaches
American men's basketball players
Basketball coaches from Indiana
Basketball players from Indiana
Cameron Aggies men's basketball players
Eastern Michigan Eagles men's basketball coaches
High school basketball coaches in Michigan
McNeese Cowboys basketball coaches
Missouri Tigers men's basketball coaches
North Dakota State College of Science alumni
Southern Jaguars basketball coaches
Texas Southern Tigers men's basketball coaches
UIC Flames men's basketball coaches
Year of birth missing (living people)
Living people